The Virgin-Martyr of Christ, Saint Helen, was the daughter of the Bekiary family and lived in the eighteenth century in Sinope, the oldest city of Pontus in modern-day Turkey.  She is commemorated in the Eastern Orthodox calendar each year on November 1.

Life
According to the Orthodox Resources website, Helen was a Greek Christian fifteen-year old living with her family in the Christian enclave at Sinope in Pontus during the 1700s.

After seeing Helen on the street, Ukuzoglu Pasha, the Turkish governor of Sinope ordered her to be kidnapped and brought to his residence.  Ukuzoglu then attempted to rape her on two separate occasions, but was stopped each time by what was described as a mysterious power like an invisible wall. Helen later escaped and returned home.

Ukuzoglu then threatened the Christian community with death unless Helen returned to him.  The Christian leaders persuaded Helen’s father to return her to the Ukuzoglu, who unsuccessfully tried to rape her several more time. Throughout this ordeal, Helen recited the Six Psalms and other prayers.

Ukuzoglu finally sent Helen to prison, where she was tortured. She finally died from two nails driven into skull and by beheading.

Death
After her death, the jailers put Helen's body in a sack and threw it into the Black Sea.  However, the sack floated away with what the Turks described as a heavenly light shining on it.

According to Orthodox Resources, a light coming from the bottom of the sea alerted a crew of Greek sailors to Helen's resting place.  Expecting to find gold, the sailors dove down to the source of the light and found the sack. After they retrieved her remains, a divine revelation showed them to be a source of healing.

Helen's body was sent to Russia, but her head was returned to Sinope, where it was venerated in the Church of the Panagia.  This relic was said to be a source of miracles, especially for those suffering from headaches.  The local priest would bring the relic to the sufferer, chant a canon of supplication, and sprinkle the person with holy water.

When the Turkish army drove the ethnic Greek population from Sinope in 1924, the refugees brought the relic with them to Greece. It is venerated today in the Church of St. Marina in the Ano Toumbas quarter of Thessalonika.

References

External links
The Holy Virgin-Martyr Helen of Sinope 

18th-century Christian saints
People from Sinop, Turkey
18th-century Eastern Orthodox martyrs
Year of birth missing
Year of death missing
Christian female saints of the Early Modern era